Grivitsa Ridge (‘Grivishki Hrebet’ \'gri-vish-ki 'hre-bet\) is the mostly ice-free ridge extending 6.4 km in northwest-southeast direction, 3 km wide and rising to 1027 m at its northwest extremity on Nordenskjöld Coast in Graham Land, Antarctica. It is bounded by Darvari Glacier to the north and Zaychar Glacier to the south, and linked to Detroit Plateau to the northwest.

The ridge is named after the settlement of Grivitsa in Northern Bulgaria.

Location
British mapping in 1978.

Map
 British Antarctic Territory.  Scale 1:200000 topographic map.  DOS 610 Series, Sheet W 64 60.  Directorate of Overseas Surveys, UK, 1978.
 Antarctic Digital Database (ADD). Scale 1:250000 topographic map of Antarctica. Scientific Committee on Antarctic Research (SCAR). Since 1993, regularly upgraded and updated.

Notes

References
 Grivitsa Ridge. SCAR Composite Antarctic Gazetteer.
 Bulgarian Antarctic Gazetteer. Antarctic Place-names Commission. (details in Bulgarian, basic data in English)

External links
 Grivitsa Ridge. Copernix satellite image

Ridges of Graham Land
Bulgaria and the Antarctic
Nordenskjöld Coast